Morris family may refer to:

 Morris family of Morrisania and New Jersey
 Morris family of Illinois and Ohio
 Morris family of Pennsylvania and New York
 Morris family of Ohio
 one of the 14 merchant families known as the Tribes of Galway, Ireland